The Ministry of Education, Science and Technology of the Republic of Kosovo (MEST) writes laws for education and science in Kosovo.

Officeholders (2008–present)
Enver Hoxhaj, 2008 - 2011
Ramë Buja, 2011 - 2014
Arsim Bajrami, 2014 - 2017
Shyqiri Bytyqi, 2017 - 2020
Hykmete Bajrami, 2020
Ramë Likaj, 2020 - 2021
Arbërie Nagavci, 2021 -

See also
 Government of Kosovo
 Education in Kosovo

External links

References

Government of Kosovo
Government ministries of Kosovo
Kosovo
Kosovo